The Aqsa Mosque or Masjid Aqsa is an Ahmadi mosque in Qadian, India. The mosque was built by Mirza Ghulam Murtaza, father of Mirza Ghulam Ahmad, the founder of the Ahmadiyya movement, in 1876. The mosque had been renovated and extended repeatedly throughout the 20th century by the Ahmadiyya administration and the capacity of the building increased from its initial capacity of 200 to 15,000 by the year 2014.
The mosque is situated inside the compound of the family house of  Ghulam Ahmad which now serves as the centre of the Ahmadiyya Muslim Community in India located close to the White Minaret and important offices of the community. The mosque is also a venue for various religious meetings and events.

See also
 Islam in India

References 

1876 establishments in India
Ahmadiyya mosques in India
Buildings and structures in Gurdaspur district
Mosques in Punjab, India